The 1903–04 season was the 12th in the history of the Western Football League.

Tottenham Hotspur were the champions of Division One for the first time, and along with all the other members of Division One, also competed in the Southern League during this season. The Division Two champions were newcomers Bristol City Reserves.

Division One
One new club joined Division One, which remained at nine clubs after Millwall Athletic left the league.
Plymouth Argyle

Division Two
Four new clubs joined Division Two, which was increased from eight clubs to 10 after Cotham Amateurs and St George left the league.
Bristol City Reserves
Radstock Town, rejoining the league
Warmley, rejoining the league
Welton Rovers, joining from the Somerset Senior League

References

1903-04
1903–04 in English association football leagues